The African Studies Centre (Afrika-Studiecentrum) is a scientific institute in the Netherlands that undertakes social-science research on Africa with the aim of promoting a better understanding of historical, current and future social developments in Sub-Saharan Africa. The centre is an interfaculty institute of Leiden
University. The present director is Marleen Dekker. The institute is located in the Pieter de la Court Building of Leiden University’s Faculty of Social Sciences.

Research
The research of the Afrika-Studiecentrum Leiden covers four themes: politics and security, society, religion and culture, and economics and history.

Various projects study international relations of African countries with the BRIC countries (Brazil, Russia, India and China) and the Arab states of the Persian Gulf, economic development and entrepreneurship, and processes in African politics and legislation. Other areas of research are language use in social movements in Africa, new developments in healthcare through telecommunications and e-health (electronic health), natural conservation and African historiography.

The Afrika-Studiecentrum publishes scientific articles and various books about its research, in-house or in collaboration with publishers such as Brill, including the Africa Yearbook and the series African Dynamics, the African Studies Collection, and the Africa Study Center Series. The topics range from international migration to social aspects of football in Africa. Most books also appear in an electronic (online) version. The Afrika-Studiecentrum annually awards a prize for the best Master's thesis in the field.

Library

The centre's library consists of some 90,000 books and about 2,000 journals (including electronic journals), government reports, brochures, African newspapers and about 1,700 documentaries and feature films on video and DVD. The centre has also developed a web service, Connecting-Africa, with links to more than 58,000 online articles about Africa. The library also has a collection of archival material including archives of African government publications and a number of personal archives.

History
The centre was founded on 12 August 1947 as the academic division of an Afrika Instituut, which initially also had an economic section, later spun off as the Netherlands-African Business Council. Over the years, many well-known Dutch Africanists have worked at the African Studies Centre, including the poet Vernie February, the activist Klaas de Jonge, 
the sociologist Robert Buijtenhuijs and the law professor and film director Emile van Rouveroy van Nieuwaal. Legal scholar Hans Holleman
 
served as a director from 1963 to 1969. Barbara Harrell-Bond worked at the centre in the 1970s, as did Deborah Bryceson in the 1990s. Kofi Abrefa Busia, who later became prime minister of Ghana, worked at the African Studies Centre between 1959 and 1962. Former director Stephen Ellis was editor in chief of Africa Confidential.
 
Petrus Johannes Idenburg, lector of African constitutional law at Leiden University, was one of the founders of the centre.

The centre was one of the founders of AEGIS, a network of African Studies Centres in Europe that was set up in 1991 to build upon the resources and research potential available within Africanist institutions in Europe.

As of 1 January 2016, the African Studies Centre is a part of Leiden University.
 On 1 April 2021, Marleen Dekker became the new director of the ASC replacing Jan Bart Gewald who had been director since 2017.

Publications

The centre publishes extensively, sometimes in cooperation with publishers such as Brill Publishers in Leiden. Among the ASC publications are:
 Africa Yearbook
 African studies abstracts online
 Kroniek van Afrika (1961-1975)

References

External links 

 
 Connecting-Africa (online articles)
 AfricaBib (bibliographic database)
 AEGIS (network of African studies centres in Europe)
 Kroniek van Afrika, online access

1947 establishments in the Netherlands
Academic libraries in the Netherlands
Africa-Europe Group for Interdisciplinary Studies
African studies
Archives in the Netherlands
Leiden University
Research institutes in the Netherlands
Research institutes established in 1947